Shamsul Kamal Bin Mohamad (born 21 May 1989) is a Malaysian professional footballer who plays for Kelantan United as a defender.

References

External links
Shamsul Kamal Profile

1989 births
Living people
Malaysian footballers
Terengganu F.C. II players
Terengganu FC players
Association football midfielders
People from Terengganu
Kelantan United F.C. players